The following highways are numbered 547:

United States